The Newport Independent School District is a public school district in Campbell County, based in Newport, Kentucky. It was established in 1847.

Schools
The Newport Independent School District has one primary school, one intermediate school, one middle school, and one high school.

References

External links

Newport, Kentucky
School districts in Kentucky
Education in Campbell County, Kentucky
1847 establishments in Kentucky
School districts established in 1847